Wall to Wall may refer to:

 Wall to Wall (production company), an independent television production company
 Wall to Wall (album), a 1981 album by René & Angela
 Wall to Wall (song), a 2007 song by Chris Brown
 "Wall to Wall" (Australian Playhouse), a 1962 episode of the Australian anthology drama series Australian Playhouse